Operation Day's Work is a solidarity program based on volunteering by high school students. It was implemented in Norway to honor the former Secretary-General of the United Nations, Dag Hammarskjöld.

During Operation Day's Work (also called Solidarity Action Day), students get the chance to exercise a job of their choice instead of going to school for one day. They donate their salaries to youth-related projects from all over the world. Today there are Operation Day's Work organisations in several countries.

Multiple Operation Day's Work organisations have engaged in the SAME network (SAME). Within this network, all the committees have agreed to the terms of the network's basic common principles and quality guidelines. These documents ensure the ecological, economic and social sustainability of the committee and their supported projects as well as the independence of any political party or religion, and include more values and principles of the organisations.

Countries with a national Operation Day's Work committee

Denmark
The national committee was formally founded in 1984.

Instructions from the department of Education specifically state that no student can be forced to take part. The pay for their work goes to a chosen project in a development country. Due to a recent agreement with the Danish Ministry of Education the students are no longer considered to be truant during this day.

Finland
The national committee in Finland is called Taksvärkki ry/Operation a Day's Work (ODW) Finland. Taksvärkki ry is a non-governmental organization (NGO) whose objective is to improve the living conditions and promote the human rights of children and young people in developing countries and to encourage Finnish young people towards global solidarity. Taksvärkki ry has implemented development cooperation projects since 1967 with funds raised by Finnish schoolchildren and students. ODW Finland also provides free development education material for schools in Finland. The campaign for the school year 2018–2019 is for active youth in Zambia. The patron of the Taksvärkki campaign is President Tarja Halonen.

Germany
In Germany there a few organizations which organize the Solidarity Action Days.

The biggest and oldest one is called Schüler Helfen Leben (Students Helping Life), founded in 1992 when war in the Balkans started. Even today this organization runs youth projects in Balkan Region. Schüler Helfen Leben is also the only Day's Work organization in Germany where only students and young volunteers organize the Solidarity Action Day, and is therefore also the only one which is part of SAME. Over the years more than 1,000,000 students earned more than 20,000,000 Euros and realized more than 150 youth projects all over the western Balkans. The Patron of the Solidarity Action Day is the German chancellor Angela Merkel.

 Another organization is called "Aktion Tagwerk". This organization is part of the Human Help Network and organizes the social day for children in Africa.

Italy
In Italy, there are two organizations that facilitate a Day's Work.

One of them is based in South Tirol, "Operation Daywork". It was founded with aid from Denmark. Operation Daywork works with both Italian speaking schools and with German speaking schools.

The second organization is also based in the North, in Veneto. It works with Italian schools and the organisation is called Social Day.

Belgium
The Belgian national committee is called 'YOUCA' (Youth for Change and Action), and was formerly known as "Zuiddag." It was founded in 2006, inspired by the similar Norwegian organization. The Belgian organisation only works with schools in the Flanders Region and Brussels Capital Region.

Norway
Operation Day's Work (Norwegian: Operasjon Dagsverk) is administered by the School Student Union of Norway and was first held in 1964. The official page provide an oversight of earlier projects:

Sweden
Sweden was the first country to establish this event. Since 1962 the national committee has been under control of a student organization called "Sveriges Elevråds Centralorganiastion, SECO." There has been a power struggle inside the SECO organization and the government has demanded oversight over the collection of the money.

The campaign for 2010 supported schools in Sudan.

United States
The national committee is called "Operation Day's Work". It was founded in 1999. According to their website they have been involved in the projects listed below.

Another organization called Schools for Schools is based on the same concept.

References

Charities based in Sweden
Volunteer organizations